Jamesburg is a borough in Middlesex County, New Jersey, United States. As of the 2020 United States census, the borough's population was 5,783, a decrease of 132 (−2.2%) from the 5,915 enumerated at the 2010 census, which in turn had reflected a decline of 110 (−1.8%) from the 6,025 counted at the 2000 census.

History

Jamesburg was formed as a borough by an act of the New Jersey Legislature on March 19, 1887, when it was created from portions of Monroe Township, based on the results of a referendum held on March 15, 1887. Jamesburg's incorporation was confirmed on April 15, 1915.

The borough was named for James Buckelew, who established a mill that became the nucleus of what is now Jamesburg. After Monroe Township officials refused to admit an African-American student into one of its schools, Buckelew funded the construction of a school located at the corner of Church Street and Gatzmer Avenue that would be open to all children. The school was named in his honor and became the derivation of the borough's name.

Roughly 75 to 100 families were evacuated from their homes and housed at the John F. Kennedy Elementary School.

Geography

According to the United States Census Bureau, the borough had a total area of 0.89 square miles (2.31 km2), including 0.88 square miles (2.29 km2) of land and 0.01 square miles (0.02 km2) of water (0.90%).

The borough is the older and more urban core area located in the center of and completely surrounded by Monroe Township, making it part of 21 pairs of "doughnut towns" in the state, where one municipality entirely surrounds another.

Demographics

2010 Census

The Census Bureau's 2006–2010 American Community Survey showed that (in 2010 inflation-adjusted dollars) median household income was $52,169 (with a margin of error of +/− $10,781) and the median family income was $69,531 (+/− $13,862). Males had a median income of $49,615 (+/− $9,412) versus $50,164 (+/− $5,717) for females. The per capita income for the borough was $28,668 (+/− $3,584). About 4.9% of families and 8.1% of the population were below the poverty line, including 5.7% of those under age 18 and 8.8% of those age 65 or over.

2000 Census

As of the 2000 United States Census there were 6,025 people, 2,176 households, and 1,551 families residing in the borough. The population density was 7,148.2 people per square mile (2,769.4/km2). There were 2,240 housing units at an average density of 2,657.6 per square mile (1,029.6/km2). The racial makeup of the borough was 82.82% White, 8.83% African American, 0.20% Native American, 2.22% Asian, 3.80% from other races, and 2.12% from two or more races. Hispanic or Latino of any race were 10.06% of the population.

There were 2,176 households, out of which 35.4% had children under the age of 18 living with them, 54.7% were married couples living together, 12.1% had a female householder with no husband present, and 28.7% were non-families. 22.4% of all households were made up of individuals, and 6.9% had someone living alone who was 65 years of age or older. The average household size was 2.70 and the average family size was 3.18.

In the borough the population was spread out, with 24.6% under the age of 18, 7.5% from 18 to 24, 35.6% from 25 to 44, 21.5% from 45 to 64, and 10.7% who were 65 years of age or older. The median age was 35 years. For every 100 females, there were 95.0 males. For every 100 females age 18 and over, there were 92.7 males.

The median income for a household in the borough was $59,461, and the median income for a family was $67,887. Males had a median income of $45,019 versus $33,333 for females. The per capita income for the borough was $23,325. About 3.0% of families and 3.5% of the population were below the poverty line, including 5.1% of those under age 18 and 3.9% of those age 65 or over.

Parks and recreation

Thompson Park is located on the south western edge of Jamesburg and is also partially located in the neighboring town of Monroe. The  Manalapan Lake is located on the eastern edge of the park. The park in total has four tennis courts, four basketball courts, two handball courts, three baseball fields, a softball field, many soccer fields, multiple picnic groves equipped with grills, three hiking/biking trails, fishing, animal haven, and a gazebo.

The park has three entrances. Two are located on Perrineville Road, and one is located on Forsgate Drive.

Monroe Township Soccer Club hosts a tournament every year on the soccer fields that are located in the park.

Government

Local government
Jamesburg is governed under the Borough form of New Jersey municipal government, which is used in 218 municipalities (of the 564) statewide, making it the most common form of government in New Jersey. The governing body is comprised of the Mayor and the Borough Council, with all positions elected at-large on a partisan basis as part of the November general election. A Mayor is elected directly by the voters to a four-year term of office. The Borough Council is comprised of six members elected to serve three-year terms on a staggered basis, with two seats coming up for election each year in a three-year cycle. The Borough form of government used by Jamesburg is a "weak mayor / strong council" government in which council members act as the legislative body with the mayor presiding at meetings and voting only in the event of a tie. The mayor can veto ordinances subject to an override by a two-thirds majority vote of the council. The mayor makes committee and liaison assignments for council members, and most appointments are made by the mayor with the advice and consent of the council.

, the Mayor of the Borough of Jamesburg is Democrat Marlene Lowande, whose term of office ends December 31, 2023. Members of the Borough Council are Council President Samantha Rampacek (D, 2022), Laura Czarneski (D, 2022), Daria Ludas (D, 2023), Coleen Rutsky (D, 2023), Shannon Spillane (R, 2024), and Brian Taylor (R, 2024).

Federal, state and county representation
Jamesburg is located in the 12th Congressional District and is part of New Jersey's 14th state legislative district.

 

Middlesex County is governed by a Board of County Commissioners, whose seven members are elected at-large on a partisan basis to serve three-year terms of office on a staggered basis, with either two or three seats coming up for election each year as part of the November general election. At an annual reorganization meeting held in January, the board selects from among its members a commissioner director and deputy director. , Middlesex County's Commissioners (with party affiliation, term-end year, and residence listed in parentheses) are 
Commissioner Director Ronald G. Rios (D, Carteret, term as commissioner ends December 31, 2024; term as commissioner director ends 2022),
Commissioner Deputy Director Shanti Narra (D, North Brunswick, term as commissioner ends 2024; term as deputy director ends 2022),
Claribel A. "Clary" Azcona-Barber (D, New Brunswick, 2022),
Charles Kenny (D, Woodbridge Township, 2022),
Leslie Koppel (D, Monroe Township, 2023),
Chanelle Scott McCullum (D, Piscataway, 2024) and 
Charles E. Tomaro (D, Edison, 2023).
Constitutional officers are
County Clerk Nancy Pinkin (D, 2025, East Brunswick),
Sheriff Mildred S. Scott (D, 2022, Piscataway) and 
Surrogate Claribel Cortes (D, 2026; North Brunswick).

Politics
As of March 23, 2011, there were a total of 2,996 registered voters in Jamesburg, of which 935 (31.2%) were registered as Democrats, 450 (15.0%) were registered as Republicans and 1,611 (53.8%) were registered as Unaffiliated. There were no voters registered to other parties.

In the 2016 presidential election, Republican Donald Trump received 50.9% of the vote (1,022 cast), ahead of Democrat Hillary Clinton, who received 45.3% of the vote (909 cast). In the 2012 presidential election, Democrat Barack Obama received 58.4% of the vote (1,103 cast), ahead of Republican Mitt Romney with 40.1% (757 votes), and other candidates with 1.5% (29 votes), among the 1,906 ballots cast by the borough's 2,998 registered voters (17 ballots were spoiled), for a turnout of 63.6%. In the 2008 presidential election, Democrat Barack Obama received 55.7% of the vote (1,172 cast), ahead of Republican John McCain with 42.0% (884 votes) and other candidates with 1.4% (29 votes), among the 2,104 ballots cast by the borough's 3,075 registered voters, for a turnout of 68.4%. In the 2004 presidential election, Democrat John Kerry received 49.3% of the vote (1,017 ballots cast), outpolling Republican George W. Bush with 48.8% (1,006 votes) and other candidates with 0.7% (20 votes), among the 2,061 ballots cast by the borough's 3,036 registered voters, for a turnout percentage of 67.9.

{| align="center" border="2" cellpadding="4" cellspacing="0" style="float:right; margin: 1em 1em 1em 0; border: 1px #aaa solid; border-collapse: collapse; font-size: 95%;"
|+ Gubernatorial Elections Results
|- bgcolor=lightgrey
! Year
!Republican
!Democratic
!Third Parties
|-
| style="text-align:center; |2017
| style="text-align:center; |50.5% 548
| style="text-align:center; |47.0%  510
| style="text-align:center; background:honeyDew;" |2.5% 27
|-
| style="text-align:center; |2013
| style="text-align:center; |63.9% 762
| style="text-align:center; |34.3%  409
| style="text-align:center; background:honeyDew;" |0.8% 131
|-
| style="text-align:center; |2009
| style="text-align:center; |54.7% 752
| style="text-align:center; |35.1%  482
| style="text-align:center; background:honeyDew;" |6.1% 1,050
|-
| style="text-align:center; |2005| style="text-align:center; |47.8% 620
| style="text-align:center; |43.5%  565
| style="text-align:center; background:honeyDew;" |7.4% 96
|}

In the 2017 gubernatorial election, Republican Kim Guadagno received 50.5% of the vote (548 votes), ahead of Democrat Phil Murphy, who received 47.0% of the vote (510 votes). In the 2013 gubernatorial election, Republican Chris Christie received 63.9% of the vote (762 cast), ahead of Democrat Barbara Buono with 34.3% (409 votes), and other candidates with 1.8% (22 votes), among the 1,201 ballots cast by the borough's 3,010 registered voters (8 ballots were spoiled), for a turnout of 39.9%. In the 2009 gubernatorial election, Republican Chris Christie received 54.7% of the vote (752 ballots cast), ahead of  Democrat Jon Corzine with 35.1% (482 votes), Independent Chris Daggett with 7.9% (108 votes) and other candidates with 1.5% (20 votes), among the 1,374 ballots cast by the borough's 2,952 registered voters, yielding a 46.5% turnout.

Incumbent Council President Samantha Rampacek (D) and Thomas Emens (D) are candidates for Borough Council in the 2022 midterm elections. No Republican candidates filed a petition to run. 

Education

The Jamesburg Public Schools serves students in pre-kindergarten through eighth grade.Jamesburg Board of Education District Policy 0110 - Identification, Jamesburg Public Schools. Accessed May 1, 2022. "Purpose: The Board of Education exists for the purpose of providing a thorough and efficient system of free public education in grades Kindergarten through eight in the Jamesburg School District. Composition: The Jamesburg School District is comprised of all the area within the municipal boundaries of Jamesburg." As of the 2020–2021 school year, the district, comprised of two schools, had an enrollment of 664 students and 64.8 classroom teachers (on an FTE basis), for a student–teacher ratio of 10.2:1. Schools in the district (with 2020–2021 enrollment data from the National Center for Education Statistics) are 
John F. Kennedy Elementary School with 463 students in grades Pre-K–5 and 
Grace M. Breckwedel Middle School with 193 students in grades 6–8.New Jersey School Directory for the Jamesburg Public Schools, New Jersey Department of Education. Accessed December 29, 2016.

Jamesburg High School, founded in 1905, graduated its last class in June 1979. Since 1980, Jamesburg's high school students attend Monroe Township High School in Monroe Township, as part of a sending/receiving relationship with the Monroe Township School District.Monroe Township High School 2016 Report Card Narrative, New Jersey Department of Education. Accessed December 12, 2017. "Monroe Township High School is centrally located within a forty-three square mile suburban community in Southern Middlesex County. Originally opened on Perrineville Road in 1973, the high school became a receiving school for approximately 300 high school age students from neighboring Jamesburg in 1980." As of the 2020–2021 school year, the high school had an enrollment of 2,474 students and 184.1 classroom teachers (on an FTE basis), for a student–teacher ratio of 13.4:1.

With annual tuition costs per student at Monroe Township High School rising past $16,000 as the Monroe district has added debt service costs into their tuition charges, the Jamesburg Public Schools looked for an alternate high school in the area to send students at lower cost, which would have started with the freshman class in 2012–2013, though students already enrolled at Monroe Township High School would continue their attendance there until they graduate. The Jamesburg district contacted 18 districts and received interest from high schools in the Freehold Regional High School District, Matawan-Aberdeen Regional School District, Old Bridge Township Public Schools, South Amboy Public Schools and the West Windsor-Plainsboro Regional School District, which had been sent demographic information in July 2011 about the Jamesburg high school population as part of their review process. By October 2011, the district decided to maintain sending students to Monroe Township, as had been done since 1979.

Eighth grade students from all of Middlesex County are eligible to apply to attend the high school programs offered by the Middlesex County Vocational and Technical Schools, a county-wide vocational school district that offers full-time career and technical education at Middlesex County Academy in Edison, the Academy for Allied Health and Biomedical Sciences in Woodbridge Township and at its East Brunswick, Perth Amboy and Piscataway technical high schools, with no tuition charged to students for attendance.Locations, Middlesex County Vocational and Technical Schools. Accessed December 2, 2019.

Transportation

Roads and highways

No Interstate, U.S. or state highways serve Jamesburg directly. The only major roads that pass through are county routes, including County Route 522, County Route 612, County Route 615 and County Route 625 (Perrineville Road).

The closest limited access road is the New Jersey Turnpike (Interstate 95) at Exit 8A in surrounding Monroe Township. Route 612 provides a connection between the Turnpike/Route 32 and CR 520.

Public transportation
In the 19th & 20th centuries, Jamesburg Borough and Monroe Township had a major railway in the area, which was the Freehold and Jamesburg Agricultural Railroad'''. This railway was owned and operated by the Camden & Amboy Railroad Company (C&A), in which surveying for the line began on September 8, 1851, grading began on October 19, 1852, and the first track was laid on April 4, 1853. The first section of line was opened on July 18, 1853. The establishment of the Freehold & Jamesburg Agricultural Railroad caused this region to become a transportation hub. The Freehold and Jamesburg Railroad was abandoned by the early 1930s. A  portion of the former railroad's right-of-way was later approved to be sold by the New Jersey Board of Public Utility Commissioners (PUC) to Jersey Central Power & Light Company in 1966, with occasional freight service still being utilized through the Freehold Industrial Track. 

Middlesex County Area Transit (MCAT) shuttles provide service to and from Jamesburg on routes operating across the county. The M1 route operates between Jamesburg and the New Brunswick train station and the M2 Route connects Jamesburg, Helmetta and Spotswood with East Brunswick including the Brunswick Square Mall.

Notable people

People who were born in, residents of, or otherwise closely associated with Jamesburg include:

 Harrison Woodhull Crosby (1814–1892), in 1847 became the first to can tomatoes
 Reed Gusciora (born 1960), politician who previously served in the General Assembly from 1996 to 2018 representing the 15th Legislative District. and is currently the mayor of Trenton
 Frankie Hayes (1914–1955), catcher in Major League Baseball from 1933 to 1947 who played for the Philadelphia Athletics for most of his career
 George Edward Pendray (1901–1987), space flight proponent

References

External links

 Jamesburg Borough website
 Jamesburg Public Schools
 
 School Data for the Jamesburg Public Schools, National Center for Education Statistics
 The Jamesburg Historical Association
 Jamesburg Flood information

 
1887 establishments in New Jersey
Borough form of New Jersey government
Boroughs in Middlesex County, New Jersey
Populated places established in 1887